The Politics of Changsha in Hunan province in the People's Republic of China is structured in a dual party-government system like all other governing institutions in mainland China. Changsha Municipal Government today is deeply influenced by its long past. Changsha's political system reflects the two major influences on the historical development of China: on the one hand, its legacy as an over 2,000 years feudal system region, and on the other, the powerful influence exerted by China's neighbor to the north, the Soviet Union. 

The Mayor of Changsha is the highest-ranking official in the People's Government of Changsha or Changsha Municipal Government. However, in the city's dual party-government governing system, the Mayor has less power than the Communist Party of Changsha  Municipal Committee Secretary, colloquially termed the "CPC Party Chief of Changsha" or "Communist Party Secretary of Changsha".

Introduction
As a city of the Communist State, Changsha's system of government was based on the Soviet Union system of one party dictatorship. This is referred to as "Soviet Union-style" democracy.

Changsha is governed by a democratically elected People's Congress, which corresponds to the parliament of democratic country. The Head of the Changsha Municipal Government is the Mayor. The Mayor's agreement is required for an Act of Changsha People's Congress to become law. The People's Congress has a number of different functions, first and foremost, it scrutinise the execution of constitution, laws, regulations in the city. Another important function is to debate the major issues of the city. Its other roles are provided the means of carrying on the work of government by voting for leaders, including chairmen and vice-chairman of the People's Congress, mayor, deputy mayor, president of the municipal court and president of the municipal procuratorate.

History
The Changsha Municipal People's Government was established in 1949 replacing the Changsha Municipal Government of the Republic of China.
 
On March 18, 2019, Vice-Mayor Li Xiaohong has been placed under investigation by the Central Commission for Discipline Inspection (CCDI), the party's internal disciplinary body, and the National Supervisory Commission, the highest anti-corruption agency of China.

List of mayors of Changsha

Republic of China

People's Republic of China

List of CPC Party secretaries of Changsha

Republic of China

People's Republic of China

References

Politics
Changsha